Saturday Night Out is a 1964 British comedy-drama film directed by Robert Hartford-Davis and starring Heather Sears, John Bonney, Bernard Lee, Erika Remberg, Francesca Annis, Margaret Nolan and David Lodge. The screenplay concerns a trio of merchant seamen on a night out in London.

The film was an independent production  shot at Shepperton Studios and on location around London. The film's set were designed by the art director Peter Proud.

Premise
A trio of merchant seamen and several passengers disembark from their ship when it arrives at the Pool of London and go out for a Saturday night's entertainment in the city.

Cast
 Heather Sears as Penny
 John Bonney as Lee
 Bernard Lee as George Hudson
 Erika Remberg as Wanda
 Colin Campbell as Jamey
 Francesca Annis as Jean
 Inigo Jackson as Harry
 Vera Day as Arlene
 Caroline Mortimer as Marline
 Margaret Nolan as Julie
 David Lodge as Arthur
 Nigel Green as Paddy
 Toni Gilpin as Margaret
 Barbara Roscoe as Miss Bingo
 Martine Beswick as Barmaid
 Patricia Hayes as Edie's mother
 Derek Bond as Paul
 Freddie Mills as Joe
 The Searchers as themselves
 David Burke as Manager
 Shirley Cameron as Edie
 Patsy Fagan as barmaid
 Gerry Gibson as doorman
 Barry Langford as barman
 Janet Milner as Waitress
 Wendy Newton as Kathy
 Jack Taylor as Landlord

Reception
Saturday Night Out is known for its portrayal of early Swinging London.

References

1964 films
1964 comedy-drama films
Films directed by Robert Hartford-Davis
British comedy-drama films
Films set in London
Films shot in London
Films shot at Shepperton Studios
1960s English-language films
1960s British films